The rock partridge or common rock partridge (Alectoris graeca) is a gamebird in the pheasant family, Phasianidae, of the order Galliformes (gallinaceous birds). It is native to southern Europe, and is closely related and very similar to its eastern equivalent, the chukar partridge, A. chukar.

Habitat
It is a resident breeder in dry, open and often hilly country.

Breeding
It nests in a scantily lined ground scrape laying 5-21 eggs.

Diet
The rock partridge takes a wide variety of seeds and some insect food.

Description
The rock partridge is a rotund bird, with a light brown back, grey breast and buff belly. The face is white with a black gorget. It has rufous-streaked flanks and red legs. When disturbed, it prefers to run rather than fly, but if necessary it flies a short distance on rounded wings. It is very similar to the chukar partridge, but is greyer on the back and has a white, not yellowish foreneck. The sharply defined gorget distinguishes this species from red-legged partridge. The song is a noisy ga-ga-ga-ga-chakera- chakera- chakera.

Conservation
This species is declining in parts of its range due to habitat loss and over-hunting. While populations are usually stable, the status of the Sicilian population may be more precarious, and certainly deserves attention (Randi 2006).

Taxonomy
This species is closely related to the chukar, Przevalski's, and Philby's partridges, forming a superspecies. The Western Mediterranean red-legged and Barbary partridges with their spotted neck collar are slightly more distant relatives. Nonetheless, although this species' range does not naturally overlap with that of its relatives, they co-occur where they have been introduced as gamebirds, for example in North America, the United Kingdom, New Zealand, and Russia, and in southeastern France where red-legged partridges have been released. In these areas, hybrids between this species, the chukar, and the red-legged partridge are usually found.(McGowan 1994, see also Randi 2006)

The rock partridge has four recognized subspecies:

 A. g. graeca (Meisner, 1804) - Serbia and Albania to Greece and Bulgaria
 A. g. orlandoi (Priolo, 1984) - Italy
 A. g. saxatilis (Bechstein, 1805) - Alps from France to western Croatia
 A. g. whitakeri (Schiebel, 1934) - Sicily

The proposed subspecies from the Apennines, A. g. orlandoi Priolo, 1984, is of doubtful validity. It is usually included in saxatilis, but apparently mostly derives from Albanian A. g. graeca. These probably crossed the Adriatic via a land-bridge during the last ice age, to become isolated only with the sea levels rising at the beginning of the Holocene c.12.000-10.000 years ago, with Alpine birds much less contributing to the Apennines population.(Randi 2006)

Apennine birds are not consistently recognizable by external morphology, and are only weakly differentiated with regards to mtDNA D-loop and hypervariable control region sequences and microsatellite genotyping. As they nonetheless constitute a discrete subpopulation evolving towards subspecies status, their population numbers could arguably deserve monitoring.(Randi 2006)

In addition, there was a paleosubspecies, A. g. martelensis, which is only known from fossils.

References

 McGowan, Philip J. K. (1994): 11. Rock Partridge. In: del Hoyo, Josep; Elliott, Andrew & Sargatal, Jordi (editors): Handbook of Birds of the World, Volume 2: New World Vultures to Guineafowl: 485, plate 43. Lynx Edicions, Barcelona. 
Randi, Ettore (2006): Evolutionary and conservation genetics of the rock partridge, Alectoris graeca. Acta Zoologica Sinica 52(Supplement): 370–374. PDF fulltext

rock partridge
Birds of Southern Europe
rock partridge